The Luzzatti government of Italy held office from 31 March 1910 until 29 March 1911, a total of 363 days, or 11 months and 28 days.

Government parties
The government was composed by the following parties:

Composition

References

Italian governments
1910 establishments in Italy